This is a chronological listing of the United States senators from New Jersey. Since the enforcement of the Seventeenth Amendment to the United States Constitution, U.S. senators are popularly elected for a six-year term beginning January 3. Elections are held the first Tuesday after November 1. Before 1914, they were chosen by the New Jersey Legislature, and before 1935, their terms began March 4. The state's current Senators are Democrats Bob Menendez (serving since 2006) and Cory Booker (serving since 2013). Frank Lautenberg was New Jersey's longest-serving senator (1982–2001; 2003–2013).

List of senators

|- style="height:2em"
! rowspan=3 | 1
| rowspan=3 align=left | Jonathan Elmer
| rowspan=3  | Pro-Admin.
| rowspan=3 nowrap | Mar 4, 1789 –Mar 3, 1791
| rowspan=3 | Elected in 1788.
| rowspan=3 | 1
| rowspan=3 
| rowspan=4 | 1
| Elected in 1788.Resigned to become New Jersey Governor.
| nowrap | Mar 4, 1789 –Nov 13, 1790
|  | Pro-Admin.
| align=right | William Paterson
! 1

|- style="height:2em"
|  
| nowrap | Nov 13, 1790 –Nov 23, 1790
| colspan=3 | Vacant

|- style="height:2em"
| rowspan=2 | Elected to finish Paterson's term.Retired.
| rowspan=2 nowrap | Nov 23, 1790 –Mar 3, 1793
| rowspan=2  | Pro-Admin.
| rowspan=2 align=right | Philemon Dickinson
! rowspan=2 | 2

|- style="height:2em"
! rowspan=5 | 2
| rowspan=5 align=left | John Rutherfurd
| rowspan=2  | Pro-Admin.
| rowspan=5 nowrap | Mar 4, 1791 –Dec 5, 1798
| rowspan=4 | Elected in 1790.
| rowspan=4 | 2
| 

|- style="height:2em"
| 
| rowspan=5 | 2
| rowspan=2 | Elected in 1792 or 1793.Resigned.
| rowspan=2 nowrap | Mar 4, 1793 –Nov 12, 1796
|  | Pro-Admin.
| rowspan=2 align=right | Frederick Frelinghuysen
! rowspan=2 | 3

|- style="height:2em"
| rowspan=3  | Federalist
| rowspan=2 
|  | Federalist

|- style="height:2em"
| rowspan=3 | Elected to finish Frelinghuysen's term.Retired.
| rowspan=3 nowrap | Nov 12, 1796 –Mar 3, 1799
| rowspan=3  | Federalist
| rowspan=3 align=right |Richard Stockton
! rowspan=3 | 4

|- style="height:2em"
| Re-elected in 1796.Resigned.
| rowspan=6 | 3
| rowspan=2 

|- style="height:2em"
! 3
| align=left | Franklin Davenport
|  | Federalist
| nowrap | Dec 5, 1798 –Mar 3, 1799
| Appointed to continue Rutherfurd's term.

|- style="height:2em"
! 4
| align=left | James Schureman
|  | Federalist
| nowrap | Mar 4, 1799 –Feb 16, 1801
| Elected to finish Rutherfurd's term.Resigned.
| rowspan=3 
| rowspan=6 | 3
| rowspan=6 | Elected in 1798.Lost re-election.
| rowspan=6 nowrap | Mar 4, 1799–Mar 3, 1805
| rowspan=6  | Federalist
| rowspan=6 align=right | Jonathan Dayton
! rowspan=6 | 5

|- style="height:2em"
| colspan=3 | Vacant
| nowrap | Feb 16, 1801 – Feb 28, 1801
|  

|- style="height:2em"
! rowspan=2 | 5
| rowspan=2 align=left | Aaron Ogden
| rowspan=2  | Federalist
| rowspan=2 nowrap | Feb 28, 1801 –Mar 3, 1803
| rowspan=2 | Elected to finish Schureman's term.Lost 

|- style="height:2em"
| 

|- style="height:2em"
| colspan=3 | Vacant
| nowrap | Mar 4, 1803 –Sep 1, 1803
| Legislature failed to elect.
| rowspan=4 | 4
| rowspan=2 

|- style="height:2em"
! rowspan=3 | 6
| rowspan=3 align=left | John Condit
| rowspan=3  | Democratic-Republican
| rowspan=3 nowrap | Sep 1, 1803 –Mar 3, 1809
| rowspan=3 | Appointed to begin the vacant term.Elected in 1803 to finish the vacant term.Lost renomination.

|- style="height:2em"
| 
| rowspan=5 | 4
| rowspan=3 | Elected in 1804.Resigned.
| rowspan=3 nowrap | Mar 4, 1805 –Mar 12, 1809
| rowspan=3  | Democratic-Republican
| rowspan=3 align=right | Aaron Kitchell
! rowspan=3 | 6

|- style="height:2em"
| 

|- style="height:2em"
! rowspan=5 | 7
| rowspan=5 align=left | John Lambert
| rowspan=5  | Democratic-Republican
| rowspan=5 nowrap | Mar 4, 1809 –Mar 3, 1815
| rowspan=5 | Elected in 1808.Lost re-election.
| rowspan=5 | 5
| rowspan=3 

|- style="height:2em"
|  
| nowrap | Mar 12, 1809 –Mar 21, 1809
| colspan=3 | Vacant

|- style="height:2em"
| Appointed to continue Kitchell's termElected in 1809 to finish Kitchell's term.
| rowspan=4 nowrap | Mar 21, 1809 –Mar 3, 1817
| rowspan=4  | Democratic-Republican
| rowspan=4 align=right | John Condit
! rowspan=4 | 7

|- style="height:2em"
| 
| rowspan=3 | 5
| rowspan=3 | Re-elected in 1810.

|- style="height:2em"
| 

|- style="height:2em"
! rowspan=3 | 8
| rowspan=3 align=left | James J. Wilson
| rowspan=3  | Democratic-Republican
| rowspan=3 nowrap | Mar 4, 1815 –Jan 8, 1821
| rowspan=3 | Elected in 1815.Lost ,resigned early.
| rowspan=5 | 6
| 

|- style="height:2em"
| 
| rowspan=5 | 6
| rowspan=5 | Elected in 1817.
| rowspan=12 nowrap | Mar 4, 1817 –Jan 30, 1829
| rowspan=7  | Democratic-Republican
| rowspan=12 align=right | Mahlon Dickerson
! rowspan=12 | 8

|- style="height:2em"
| rowspan=3 

|- style="height:2em"
| colspan=3 | Vacant
| nowrap | Jan 8, 1821 –Jan 26, 1821
|  

|- style="height:2em"
! rowspan=2 | 9
| rowspan=2 align=left | Samuel L. Southard
| rowspan=2  | Democratic-Republican
| rowspan=2 nowrap | Jan 26, 1821 –Mar 3, 1823
| Appointed to finish Wilson's term, having been elected to the next term.

|- style="height:2em"
| Elected in 1820.Resigned to become U.S. Secretary of the Navy.
| rowspan=6 | 7
| 

|- style="height:2em"
| colspan=3 | Vacant
| nowrap | Mar 4, 1823 –Nov 12, 1823
|  
| rowspan=2 
| rowspan=8 | 7
| rowspan=7 | Re-elected in 1823.Resigned and immediately  for the Class 1 seat.

|- style="height:2em"
! rowspan=2 | 10
| rowspan=2 align=left | Joseph McIlvaine
|  | Democratic-Republican
| rowspan=2 nowrap | Nov 12, 1823 –Aug 19, 1826
| rowspan=2 | Elected to finish Southard's term.Died.

|- style="height:2em"
|  | NationalRepublican
| rowspan=3 
| rowspan=5  | Jacksonian

|- style="height:2em"
| colspan=3 | Vacant
| nowrap | Aug 19, 1826 –Nov 10, 1826
|  

|- style="height:2em"
! rowspan=2 | 11
| rowspan=2 align=left | Ephraim Bateman
| rowspan=2  | NationalRepublican
| rowspan=2 nowrap | Nov 10, 1826 –Jan 12, 1829
| Elected to finish McIlvaine's term.

|- style="height:2em"
| Elected to full term in 1826.Resigned because of failing health.
| rowspan=5 | 8
| rowspan=3 

|- style="height:2em"
| colspan=3 | Vacant
| nowrap | Jan 12, 1829 –Jan 30, 1829
|  

|- style="height:2em"
! rowspan=3 | 12
| rowspan=3 align=left | Mahlon Dickerson
| rowspan=3  | Jacksonian
| rowspan=3 nowrap | Jan 30, 1829 –Mar 3, 1833
| rowspan=3 | Elected to finish Bateman's term.
|  
| nowrap | Jan 30, 1829 –Mar 3, 1829
| colspan=3 | Vacant

|- style="height:2em"
| 
| rowspan=3 | 8
| rowspan=3 | Elected in 1829.
| rowspan=3 nowrap | Mar 4, 1829 –Mar 3, 1835
| rowspan=3  | NationalRepublican
| rowspan=3 align=right | Theodore Frelinghuysen
! rowspan=3 | 9

|- style="height:2em"
| 

|- style="height:2em"
! rowspan=5 | 13
| rowspan=5 align=left | Samuel L. Southard
| rowspan=2  | NationalRepublican
| rowspan=5 nowrap | Mar 4, 1833 –Jun 26, 1842
| rowspan=3 | Elected in 1833.
| rowspan=3 | 9
| 

|- style="height:2em"
| 
| rowspan=3 | 9
| rowspan=3 | Elected in 1835.Lost re-election.
| rowspan=3 nowrap | Mar 4, 1835 –Mar 3, 1841
|  | Jacksonian
| rowspan=3 align=right | Garret D. Wall
! rowspan=3 | 10

|- style="height:2em"
| rowspan=3  | Whig
| 
| rowspan=2  | Democratic

|- style="height:2em"
| rowspan=2 | Re-elected in 1839.Resigned due to failing health.
| rowspan=5 | 10
| 

|- style="height:2em"
| rowspan=3 
| rowspan=5 | 10
| rowspan=5 | Elected in 1840.
| rowspan=9 nowrap | Mar 4, 1841 –Mar 3, 1853
| rowspan=9  | Whig
| rowspan=9 align=right | Jacob W. Miller
! rowspan=9 | 11

|- style="height:2em"
| colspan=3 | Vacant
| nowrap | Jun 26, 1842 –Jul 2, 1842
|  

|- style="height:2em"
! rowspan=5 | 14
| rowspan=5 align=left | William L. Dayton
| rowspan=5  | Whig
| rowspan=5 nowrap | Jul 2, 1842 –Mar 3, 1851
| rowspan=2 | Appointed to continue Southard's term.Elected to finish Southard's term.

|- style="height:2em"
| 

|- style="height:2em"
| rowspan=3 | Re-elected in 1845.Lost re-election.
| rowspan=3 | 11
| 

|- style="height:2em"
| 
| rowspan=4 | 11
| rowspan=4 | Re-elected in 1846.Lost re-election.

|- style="height:2em"
| 

|- style="height:2em"
! 15
| align=left | Robert F. Stockton
|  | Democratic
| nowrap | Mar 4, 1851 –Jan 10, 1853
| Elected in 1851.Resigned to become President of the Delaware and Raritan Canal Company.
| rowspan=4 | 12
| rowspan=2 

|- style="height:2em"
| colspan=3 | Vacant
| nowrap | Jan 10, 1853 –Mar 4, 1853
|  

|- style="height:2em"
! rowspan=5 | 16
| rowspan=5 align=left | John Renshaw Thomson
| rowspan=5  | Democratic
| rowspan=5 nowrap | Mar 4, 1853 –Sep 12, 1862
| rowspan=2 | Elected to finish Stockton's term.
| 
| rowspan=3 | 12
| rowspan=3 | Elected in 1853.Lost re-election.
| rowspan=3 nowrap | Mar 4, 1853 –Mar 3, 1859
| rowspan=3  | Democratic
| rowspan=3 align=right | William Wright
! rowspan=3 | 12

|- style="height:2em"
| 

|- style="height:2em"
| rowspan=3 | Re-elected in 1857.Died.
| rowspan=6 | 13
| 

|- style="height:2em"
| 
| rowspan=6 | 13
| rowspan=6 | Elected in 1858.Lost re-election.
| rowspan=6 nowrap | Mar 4, 1859 –Mar 3, 1865
| rowspan=6  | Republican
| rowspan=6 align=right | John C. Ten Eyck
! rowspan=6 | 13

|- style="height:2em"
| rowspan=4 

|- style="height:2em"
| colspan=3 | Vacant
| nowrap | Sep 12, 1862 –Nov 21, 1862
|  

|- style="height:2em"
! 17
| align=left | Richard Stockton Field
|  | Republican
| nowrap | Nov 21, 1862 –Jan 14, 1863
| Appointed to continue Thomson's term.Retired when his successor was elected.

|- style="height:2em"
! 18
| align=left | James Walter Wall
|  | Democratic
| nowrap | Jan 14, 1863 –Mar 3, 1863
| Elected to finish Thomson's term.Lost re-election.

|- style="height:2em"
! rowspan=5 | 19
| rowspan=5 align=left | William Wright
| rowspan=5  | Democratic
| rowspan=5 nowrap | Mar 4, 1863 –Nov 1, 1866
| rowspan=5 | Elected in 1863.Died.
| rowspan=8 | 14
| 

|- style="height:2em"
| rowspan=6 
| rowspan=8 | 14
|  
| nowrap | Mar 3, 1865–Mar 15, 1865
| colspan=3 | Vacant

|- style="height:2em"
| Elected in 1864.Election disputed and seat declared vacant.
| nowrap | Mar 15, 1865 –Mar 27, 1866
|  | Democratic
| align=right | John P. Stockton
! 14

|- style="height:2em"
|  
| nowrap | Mar 27, 1866 –Sep 19, 1866
| colspan=3 | Vacant

|- style="height:2em"
| rowspan=5 | Elected to finish Stockton's term.Retired.
| rowspan=5 nowrap | Sep 19, 1866 –Mar 3, 1871
| rowspan=5  | Republican
| rowspan=5 align=right | Alexander G. Cattell
! rowspan=5 | 15

|- style="height:2em"
| colspan=3 | Vacant
| nowrap | Nov 1, 1866 –Nov 12, 1866
|  

|- style="height:2em"
! rowspan=2 | 20
| rowspan=2 align=left | Frederick T. Frelinghuysen
| rowspan=2  | Republican
| rowspan=2 nowrap | Nov 12, 1866 –Mar 3, 1869
| rowspan=2 | Appointed to continue Wright's term.Elected in 1867 to finish Wright's term.Lost re-election.

|- style="height:2em"
| 

|- style="height:2em"
! rowspan=3 | 21
| rowspan=3 align=left | John P. Stockton
| rowspan=3  | Democratic
| rowspan=3 nowrap | Mar 4, 1869 –Mar 3, 1875
| rowspan=3 | Elected in 1869.
| rowspan=3 | 15
| 

|- style="height:2em"
| 
| rowspan=3 | 15
| rowspan=3 | Elected in 1870 or 1871.Lost re-election.
| rowspan=3 nowrap | Mar 4, 1871–Mar 3, 1877
| rowspan=3  | Republican
| rowspan=3 align=right | Frederick T. Frelinghuysen
! rowspan=3 | 16

|- style="height:2em"
| 

|- style="height:2em"
! rowspan=3 | 22
| rowspan=3 align=left | Theodore F. Randolph
| rowspan=3  | Democratic
| rowspan=3 nowrap | Mar 4, 1875 –Mar 3, 1881
| rowspan=3 | Elected in 1875.
| rowspan=3 | 16
| 

|- style="height:2em"
| 
| rowspan=3 | 16
| rowspan=3 | Elected in 1877.
| rowspan=9 nowrap | Mar 4, 1877–Mar 3, 1895
| rowspan=9  | Democratic
| rowspan=9 align=right | John R. McPherson
! rowspan=9 | 17

|- style="height:2em"
| 

|- style="height:2em"
! rowspan=3 | 23
| rowspan=3 align=left | William Joyce Sewell
| rowspan=3  | Republican
| rowspan=3 nowrap | Mar 4, 1881 –Mar 3, 1887
| rowspan=3 | Elected in 1881.Lost re-election.
| rowspan=3 | 17
| 

|- style="height:2em"
| 
| rowspan=3 | 17
| rowspan=3 | Re-elected in 1883.

|- style="height:2em"
| 

|- style="height:2em"
! rowspan=3 | 24
| rowspan=3 align=left | Rufus Blodgett
| rowspan=3  | Democratic
| rowspan=3 nowrap | Mar 4, 1887 –Mar 3, 1893
| rowspan=3 | Elected in 1886.Retired.
| rowspan=3 | 18
| 

|- style="height:2em"
| 
| rowspan=3 | 18
| rowspan=3 | Re-elected in 1889.

|- style="height:2em"
| 

|- style="height:2em"
! rowspan=3 | 25
| rowspan=3 align=left | James Smith Jr.
| rowspan=3  | Democratic
| rowspan=3 nowrap | Mar 4, 1893 –Mar 3, 1899
| rowspan=3 | Elected in 1893.Lost re-election.
| rowspan=3 | 19
| 

|- style="height:2em"
| 
| rowspan=3 | 19
| rowspan=3 | Elected in 1895.
| rowspan=4 nowrap | Mar 4, 1895–Dec 27, 1901
| rowspan=4  | Republican
| rowspan=4 align=right | William Joyce Sewell
! rowspan=4 | 18

|- style="height:2em"
| 

|- style="height:2em"
! rowspan=8 | 26
| rowspan=8 align=left | John Kean
| rowspan=8  | Republican
| rowspan=8 nowrap | Mar 4, 1899 –Mar 3, 1911
| rowspan=5 | Elected in 1899.
| rowspan=5 | 20
| 

|- style="height:2em"
| rowspan=3 
| rowspan=5 | 20
| Re-elected in 1901.Died.

|- style="height:2em"
|  
| nowrap | Dec 27, 1901–Jan 29, 1902
| colspan=3 | Vacant

|- style="height:2em"
| rowspan=3 | Elected to finish Sewell's term.Withdrew from election contest to full term.
| rowspan=3 nowrap | Jan 29, 1902–Mar 3, 1907
| rowspan=3  | Republican
| rowspan=3 align=right | John F. Dryden
! rowspan=3 | 19

|- style="height:2em"
| 

|- style="height:2em"
| rowspan=3 | Re-elected in 1905.Retired.
| rowspan=3 | 21
| 

|- style="height:2em"
| 
| rowspan=3 | 21
| rowspan=3 | Elected in 1907.Lost re-election.
| rowspan=3 nowrap | Mar 4, 1907 –Mar 3, 1913
| rowspan=3  | Republican
| rowspan=3 align=right | Frank O. Briggs
! rowspan=3 | 20

|- style="height:2em"
| 

|- style="height:2em"
! rowspan=3 | 27
| rowspan=3 align=left | James Edgar Martine
| rowspan=3  | Democratic
| rowspan=3 nowrap | Mar 4, 1911 –Mar 3, 1917
| rowspan=3 | Elected in 1911.Lost re-election.
| rowspan=3 | 22
| 

|- style="height:2em"
| 
| rowspan=5 | 22
| rowspan=3 | Elected in 1913.Died.
| rowspan=3 nowrap | Mar 4, 1913 –Jan 30, 1918
| rowspan=3  | Democratic
| rowspan=3 align=right | William Hughes
! rowspan=3 | 21

|- style="height:2em"
| 

|- style="height:2em"
! rowspan=5 | 28
| rowspan=5 align=left | Joseph S. Frelinghuysen Sr.
| rowspan=5  | Republican
| rowspan=5 nowrap | Mar 4, 1917 –Mar 3, 1923
| rowspan=5 | Elected in 1916.Lost re-election.
| rowspan=5 | 23
| rowspan=3 

|- style="height:2em"
|  
| nowrap | Jan 30, 1918 –Feb 23, 1918
| colspan=3 | Vacant

|- style="height:2em"
| Appointed to continue Hughes's term.Elected in 1918 to finish Hughes's term.Retired.
| nowrap | Feb 23, 1918 –Mar 3, 1919
|  | Republican
| align=right | David Baird Sr.
! 22

|- style="height:2em"
| 
| rowspan=3 | 23
| rowspan=3 | Elected in 1918.
| rowspan=6 nowrap | Mar 4, 1919 –Nov 21, 1929
| rowspan=6  | Republican
| rowspan=6 align=right | Walter Evans Edge
! rowspan=6 | 23

|- style="height:2em"
| 

|- style="height:2em"
! rowspan=3 | 29
| rowspan=3 align=left | Edward I. Edwards
| rowspan=3  | Democratic
| rowspan=3 nowrap | Mar 4, 1923 –Mar 3, 1929
| rowspan=3 | Elected in 1922.Lost re-election.
| rowspan=3 | 24
| 

|- style="height:2em"
| 
| rowspan=6 | 24
| rowspan=3 | Re-elected in 1924.Resigned to become U.S. Ambassador to France.

|- style="height:2em"
| 

|- style="height:2em"
! rowspan=8 | 30
| rowspan=8 align=left | Hamilton Fish Kean
| rowspan=8  | Republican
| rowspan=8 nowrap | Mar 4, 1929 –Jan 3, 1935
| rowspan=8 | Elected in 1928.Lost re-election.
| rowspan=8 | 25
| rowspan=4 

|- style="height:2em"
|  
| nowrap | Nov 21, 1929 –Nov 30, 1929
| colspan=3 | Vacant

|- style="height:2em"
| Appointed to continue Edge's term.Retired when his successor was qualified.
| nowrap | Nov 30, 1929 –Dec 2, 1930
|  | Republican
| align=right | David Baird Jr.
! 24

|- style="height:2em"
| Elected in 1930 to finish Edge's term.
| rowspan=2 nowrap | Dec 3, 1930 –Oct 5, 1931
| rowspan=2  | Republican
| rowspan=2 align=right | Dwight Morrow
! rowspan=2 | 25

|- style="height:2em"
| rowspan=3 
| rowspan=5 | 25
| Elected to full term in 1930.Died.

|- style="height:2em"
|  
| nowrap | Oct 5, 1931 –Dec 1, 1931
| colspan=3 | Vacant

|- style="height:2em"
| rowspan=3 | Appointed to continue Morrow's term.Elected in 1932 to finish Morrow's term.Lost re-election.
| rowspan=3 nowrap | Dec 1, 1931 –Jan 3, 1937
| rowspan=3  | Republican
| rowspan=3 align=right | William Warren Barbour
! rowspan=3 | 26

|- style="height:2em"
| 

|- style="height:2em"
! rowspan=2 | 31
| rowspan=2 align=left | A. Harry Moore
| rowspan=2  | Democratic
| rowspan=2 nowrap | Jan 3, 1935 –Jan 17, 1938
| rowspan=2 | Elected in 1934.Resigned to become governor.
| rowspan=5 | 26
| 

|- style="height:2em"
| rowspan=3 
| rowspan=5 | 26
| rowspan=5 | Elected in 1936.Lost re-election.
| rowspan=5 nowrap | Jan 3, 1937 –Jan 3, 1943
| rowspan=5  | Democratic
| rowspan=5 align=right | William H. Smathers
! rowspan=5 | 27

|- style="height:2em"
! 32
| align=left | John Gerald Milton
|  | Democratic
| nowrap | Jan 18, 1938 –Nov 8, 1938
| Appointed to continue Moore's term.Retired when successor qualified.

|- style="height:2em"
! rowspan=4 | 33
| rowspan=4 align=left | William Warren Barbour
| rowspan=4  | Republican
| rowspan=4 | Nov 8, 1938 –Nov 22, 1943
| rowspan=2 | Elected to finish Moore's term

|- style="height:2em"
| 

|- style="height:2em"
| rowspan=2 | Re-elected in 1940.Died.
| rowspan=6 | 27
| 

|- style="height:2em"
| rowspan=4 
| rowspan=6 | 27
| rowspan=6 | Elected in 1942.Retired.
| rowspan=6 nowrap | Jan 3, 1943 –Jan 3, 1949
| rowspan=6  | Republican
| rowspan=6 align=right | Albert W. Hawkes
! rowspan=6 | 28

|- style="height:2em"
| colspan=3 | Vacant
| nowrap | Nov 22, 1943 –Nov 26, 1943
|  

|- style="height:2em"
! 34
| align=left | Arthur Walsh
|  | Democratic
| Nov 26, 1943 –Dec 7, 1944
| Appointed to finish Barbour's termRetired when successor was elected

|- style="height:2em"
! rowspan=8 | 35
| rowspan=8 align=left | Howard Alexander Smith
| rowspan=8  | Republican
| rowspan=8 | Dec 7, 1944–Jan 3, 1959
| rowspan=2 | Elected to finish Barbour's term.

|- style="height:2em"
| 

|- style="height:2em"
| rowspan=3 | Re-elected in 1946.
| rowspan=3 | 28
| 

|- style="height:2em"
| 
| rowspan=3 | 28
| rowspan=3 | Elected in 1948.Retired.
| rowspan=3 nowrap | Jan 3, 1949 –Jan 2, 1955
| rowspan=3  | Republican
| rowspan=3 align=right | Robert C. Hendrickson
! rowspan=3 | 29

|- style="height:2em"
| 

|- style="height:2em"
| rowspan=3 | Re-elected in 1952.Retired.
| rowspan=3 | 29
| 

|- style="height:2em"
| 
| rowspan=3 | 29
| rowspan=3 | Elected in 1954.
| rowspan=12 nowrap | Jan 3, 1955 –Jan 3, 1979
| rowspan=12  | Republican
| rowspan=12 align=right | Clifford P. Case
! rowspan=12 | 30

|- style="height:2em"
| 

|- style="height:2em"
! rowspan=12 | 36
| rowspan=12 align=left | Harrison A. Williams
| rowspan=12  | Democratic
| rowspan=12 | Jan 3, 1959–Mar 11, 1982
| rowspan=3 | Elected in 1958.
| rowspan=3 | 30
| 

|- style="height:2em"
| 
| rowspan=3 | 30
| rowspan=3 | Re-elected in 1960.

|- style="height:2em"
| 

|- style="height:2em"
| rowspan=3 | Re-elected in 1964.
| rowspan=3 | 31
| 

|- style="height:2em"
| 
| rowspan=3 | 31
| rowspan=3 | Re-elected in 1966.

|- style="height:2em"
| 

|- style="height:2em"
| rowspan=3 | Re-elected in 1970.
| rowspan=3 | 32
| 

|- style="height:2em"
| 
| rowspan=3 | 32
| rowspan=3 | Re-elected in 1972.Lost re-nomination.

|- style="height:2em"
| 

|- style="height:2em"
| rowspan=3 | Re-elected in 1976.Resigned.
| rowspan=6 | 33
| 

|- style="height:2em"
| 
| rowspan=6 | 33
| rowspan=6 | Elected in 1978.
| rowspan=12 | Jan 3, 1979 –Jan 3, 1997
| rowspan=12  | Democratic
| rowspan=12 align=right | Bill Bradley
! rowspan=12 | 31

|- style="height:2em"
| rowspan=4 

|- style="height:2em"
| colspan=3 | Vacant
| nowrap | Mar 11, 1982 –Apr 12, 1982
|  

|- style="height:2em"
! 37
| align=left | Nicholas F. Brady
|  | Republican
| nowrap | Apr 12, 1982 –Dec 20, 1982
| Appointed to finish Williams's term.Retired and resigned early to give his elected successor preferential seniority.

|- style="height:2em"
! rowspan=10 | 38
| rowspan=10 align=left | Frank Lautenberg
| rowspan=10  | Democratic
| rowspan=10 nowrap | Dec 27, 1982 –Jan 3, 2001
| Appointed early, having been already elected to the next term.

|- style="height:2em"
| rowspan=3 | Elected in 1982.
| rowspan=3 | 34
| 

|- style="height:2em"
| 
| rowspan=3 | 34
| rowspan=3 | Re-elected in 1984.

|- style="height:2em"
| 

|- style="height:2em"
| rowspan=3 | Re-elected in 1988.
| rowspan=3 | 35
| 

|- style="height:2em"
| 
| rowspan=3 | 35
| rowspan=3 | Re-elected in 1990.Retired.

|- style="height:2em"
| 

|- style="height:2em"
| rowspan=3 | Re-elected in 1994.Retired.
| rowspan=3 | 36
| 

|- style="height:2em"
| 
| rowspan=3 | 36
| rowspan=3 | Elected in 1996.Ran for re-election, but withdrew.
| rowspan=3 | Jan 3, 1997 –Jan 3, 2003
| rowspan=3  | Democratic
| rowspan=3 align=right | Robert Torricelli
! rowspan=3 | 32

|- style="height:2em"
| 

|- style="height:2em"
! rowspan=3 | 39
| rowspan=3 align=left | Jon Corzine
| rowspan=3  | Democratic
| rowspan=3 | Jan 3, 2001 –Jan 17, 2006
| rowspan=3 | Elected in 2000.Resigned to become Governor of New Jersey.
| rowspan=4 | 37
| 

|- style="height:2em"
| 
| rowspan=4 | 37
| rowspan=4 | Elected in 2002.
| rowspan=7 | Jan 3, 2003 –Jun 3, 2013
| rowspan=7 nowrap  | Democratic
| rowspan=7 align=right | Frank Lautenberg
! rowspan=7 | 33

|- style="height:2em"
| rowspan=2 

|- style="height:2em"
! rowspan=13 | 40
| rowspan=13 align=left | Bob Menendez
| rowspan=13 nowrap  | Democratic
| rowspan=13 | Jan 18, 2006 –Present
| Appointed to finish Corzine's term.

|- style="height:2em"
| rowspan=3 | Elected to full term in 2006.
| rowspan=3 | 38
| 

|- style="height:2em"
| 
| rowspan=6 | 38
| rowspan=3 | Re-elected in 2008.Died.

|- style="height:2em"
| 

|- style="height:2em"
| rowspan=6 | Re-elected in 2012.
| rowspan=6 | 39
| rowspan=4 

|- style="height:2em"
|  
| nowrap | Jun 3, 2013 –Jun 10, 2013
| colspan=3 | Vacant

|- style="height:2em"
| Appointed to continue Lautenberg's term.Retired when his successor was elected.
| Jun 10, 2013 –Oct 31, 2013
|  | Republican
| align=right | Jeffrey Chiesa
! 34

|- style="height:2em"
| Elected in 2013 to finish Lautenberg's term.
| rowspan=7 | Oct 31, 2013 –Present
| rowspan=7 nowrap  | Democratic
| rowspan=7 align=right | Cory Booker
! rowspan=7 | 35

|- style="height:2em"
| 
| rowspan=3 | 39
| rowspan=3 | Re-elected in 2014.

|- style="height:2em"
| 

|- style="height:2em"
| rowspan=3 | Re-elected in 2018.
| rowspan=3 | 40
| 

|- style="height:2em"
| 
| rowspan=3 | 40
| rowspan=3 |Re-elected in 2020.

|- style="height:2em"
| 

|- style="height:2em"
| rowspan=2 colspan=5 | To be determined in the 2024 election.
| rowspan=2|41
| 

|- style="height:2em"
| 
| 41
| colspan=5 | To be determined in the 2026 election.

See also

 List of United States representatives from New Jersey
 United States congressional delegations from New Jersey
 Elections in New Jersey

Notes

References 

 

 
United States Senators
New Jersey